The Waropen or also called Wonti is an ethnic group that inhabits coastal areas in northern Papua, especially in Waropen Regency and several surrounding areas especially Upper Waropen in Mamberamo Raya Regency. People of the Waropen communicate using Waropen language as their native language, and Indonesian, and Papuan Malay as lingua franca in their area.

History

Invention by Dutch colonial
Jacob Weyland, a Dutch researcher first mentioned the word "Aropen", first mentioned by Jacob Weyland in 1705. At that time Weyland sailed to Aropen on the orders of Dutch government with the sailing ships Geelvink, Kraanvogel, and Nova Guinea. Then Weyland got off the sailing ship and reached a settlement called "Erropang" (Aropen) on 30 May 1705. At that time the people there were afraid and worried about white peoples. The natives themselves call it the word "Waropen" which means people who come from the interior, namely from Mount Tonater, Wamusopedai. This can be justified, because there is a relationship with the beliefs that live in the Waropen customary law community. This means that the Waropen people are people who migrated to the coastal area due to the heavy waterfall, so that the Waropen people were swept away to Waropen Ambumi and Roon in Nabire Regency and Manokwari Regency to the west, and Waropen Ronari to the east. While the others live on the coast of Waropen Kai.

Anthropology from the Netherlands held, divides the Waropen area according to customary territory which is reflected in differences in the use of everyday language. These areas include Waropen Ambumi, Waropen Kai and Waropen Ronari. The Waropen Ambumi community is divided into two groups in the Nabire, respectively Napan, Weinami, Masipawe, Makimi, Moor, Mambor, dan Ambumi. In addition, there are groups that enter the area of Manokwari Regency and inhabit the villages of Yendeman, Saybes, War, Kayob, and Menarbu. Meanwhile, the Waropen Kai people inhabit the villages of Semanui, Wapoga, Desawa, Waren, and the villages of Paradoi, Sanggei, Mambui, and Nubuai who are members of one settlement, namely Urei Faisei, Risei Sayati, Wonti, Bokaro, and Koweda. This group, according to research from Vesibe Rhibka Assa and Desy Polla Usmany from the Ministry of Education and Culture Director General of Culture of the 2015 Jayapura Papua Cultural Values Preservation Center, in the book Sera Leadership System, are the original people of Waropen.

Waropen Regency
The area inhabited by the Waropen people was then officially entered into the administrative area Waropen Regency in Papua Province which consists of the Upper Waropen District, Masirei District, and Lower Waropen District.

Now the Waropen area has been established as one of the regency in Papua Province. The district capital is located in Botawa. This regency was formed as a result of Yapen Waropen Regency in about 2003.

Language

Waropen is Austronesian spoken in Geelvink Bay, Papua. This language is closely related to Yapen. The dialects are Waropen Kai, Napan, and Ambumi.

In Papua Province, this language is spoken in Mamberamo Raya Regency, and Waropen Regency. The Ambumi dialect is spoken in the southern region of Waropen Bay. The Waropen language is also spoken in the southern part of Teluk Wondama Regency.

Culture
The people of Waropen are familiar with the traditional leadership structure known in the "sera" leadership system. In fact, there are differences between the titles sera and serabawah that need deep attention.

Doctoral anthropologist from Leiden University J.R. Mansoben in his dissertation mentions, the traditional leadership system in the Waropen people, important leaders are at the "da" or clan level, not at the "nu" or village level. While "nu" is formed from a number of "da", physically the location of the house is between one da and another da. But it can also be found in the same location in the river.

In the past during the capture of slaves, a number of da or clan leaders joined in certain settlement locations to form a common force, during war and maintaining common security. Although in daily life da do not depend on each other. They will unite in the event of a war or a slave capture expedition.

The leader of the da unit is called sera, while Sera means the leader, the head or the one in charge. If a sera is from an old clan among her siblings and from an eldest clan branch, so called "serabawah" or "seratinggu" which means a true leader or a great leader. According to Mansoben, a Sera Bawah is a leadership model that can be achieved because it has qualities by showing the nature of Kako, which means brave or mighty and knowledgeable about customs.

Mansoben added that the Waropen people belonged to the Mixed Leadership system. This system shows the characteristics of attainment and inheritance which is called a mixed system. Mixed leadership system, the position of the leader is obtained through inheritance and achievement or based on individual abilities (achievement and descent). This type is found in the occupation of Cenderawasih Bay, Biak, Wandamen, Waropen, and Yapen.

Therefore, the right of sera is if a serabawah, is entitled to the first slaves that his clan members catch or clan tails. Also got a tobacco offer from a young couple who had just married. He also has the right to get help from his clan members to build his house called seraruma. Gives honorary titles to clan members who are considered meritorious in war and bravery.

Another privilege of getting big fish heads caught by clan members, the right to wear a head pin and the right to wear a Dumasura or a kind of bamboo comb during initiation ceremonies. Meanwhile, a taboo that sera must not violate is not allowed to cheat but can marry more than one wife. No cheating and stealing.

According to Mansoben, sera's appointment process was that she was old and physically weak. This position can be passed on to his eldest son. If the eldest son is not old enough, it can be passed on to his younger siblings from his father. But in Waropen society, sera's position can also be held by a woman called mosaba or queen. The late Hengki Wanda, the songwriter of mosaba, said that a mosaba is also a direct descendant of a sera. Or the first child of a sera, he also determines the amount of dowry payments in each clan.

See also

Indigenous people of New Guinea

References

Ethnic groups in Indonesia
Waropen Regency